Minoriteam is an American adult animated television series on Cartoon Network's late night programming block, Adult Swim. It ran from 2005 to 2006, with a total of one season and 20 episodes. The show was not renewed for another season and was cancelled. It continued to have a web presence on the Adult Swim website, with episodes streaming intermittently, until its removal on June 12, 2020.

Plot
The plot of the show revolves around five superheroes, each of whom is based on a racial or ethnic stereotype, who join forces to fight against a bunch of villains who are mostly discriminatory concepts. The show's artwork is largely an homage to Jack Kirby ("King Kirby" is thanked in the show's end credits), while the animation style parodies the limited animation of the Marvel Super Heroes Show of 1966.  The opening tag declaring that Minoriteam is broadcast "FULLY COLORED" is both a racial reference and an homage to the "IN COLOR" or "IN TECHNICOLOR" line opening many old cartoons.

Characters

Minoriteam
 Dr. Wang, Chinese Human Calculator (voiced by Dana Snyder) – The leader of the Minoriteam. He is paraplegic. He has a terrible personality and powerful mental abilities gained from drinking his own urine. He also owns and operates a laundromat where he charges extra to get your clothes back from the machines. In addition, he has faked accidents to obtain legal settlements and is a compulsive gambler. He has no known non-stereotypical in real life. In the episode "The Assimilator", Dr. Wang gives the team "tea" to drink and then tells them that it is his urine.  His depiction as Chinese, however, leans more to the stereotype of Northeast Chinese people, mostly with his mustache and queue, which otherwise makes his design reminiscent of Dr. Fu Manchu.
 El Jefe (voiced by Nick Puga) – El Jefe is an overweight, moustached Mexican who fights crime with the Leafblower 3000, the deadliest weapon in the entire universe. His mask is a Sombrero pulled halfway down his face with eye holes cut in it. In his non-stereotypical real life, Richard Escartin is the handsome billionaire CEO of his own oil company. El Jefe is also 1/18th Viking.
 Fasto (voiced by Rodney Saulsberry) – An African-American who is known as “the fastest man that ever was.” In addition, he seems to have the power to seduce or charm all white women in the immediate area. Fasto wears a green mask, a T-shirt, cut-off jeans, striped tube socks, and sneakers. In his non-stereotypical real life, Landon K. Dutton is a bookish and bespectacled Professor of Women's Studies. He vigorously pursues sexual relationships with what he calls "booty" (especially white women) but is uninterested in an exclusive relationship. His father is a space-alien from the planet Blackton which was destroyed by Balactus.
 Jewcano (voiced by Enn Reitel) – A white-bearded, massively muscular man in a yarmulke (which he can throw like a deadly frisbee a la Wonder Woman's tiara) and a Star of David leotard with the powers of the Jewish faith and the fiery fury of an erupting volcano (after being knocked into a volcano accidentally by Dr. Wang). He is always screaming at the top of his lungs. In his non-stereotypical real life, wimpy young accountant Neil Horowitz dates Mika, Fasto's statuesque younger cousin, and loves soul food. Jewcano is also the member of Minoriteam who spends the most time in his civilian garb (or merely has his civilian garb shown on-screen more often than his teammates' garbs).
 Non-Stop (voiced by Keith Lal) – An Indian convenience store owner who is immune to bullets and fire because of his lead-lined skin. His non-stereotypical identity of Dave Raj is an ex-professional skateboarder, a talent that comes in handy when flying on his magic carpet. While not fighting crime, Dave sometimes smokes a hookah. He sometimes says "Krishna, give me strength!" when surprised and his magic word to transform into his bearded, bare-chested, turban-clad alter ego is "Abrakazoom!".

White Shadow Organization
The five heroes team up to fight characters who are mostly racial stereotypes, including a collective of villains comprising numerous, over-the-top Caucasian stereotypes. The White Shadow organization, the "evilest organization known to Man", is based in Corporate City. Its mission is to promote white supremacy and racism and oppress minorities.

The White Shadow Organization's most important members appear in almost every episode. They are:

 The White Shadow (voiced by Adam de la Peña) – The leader of this organization of supervillains which is named after him. He has a one-eyed golden helmet in the shape of the "Great Seal" pyramid on the U.S. one-dollar bill, which some have considered the Freemasonry/Illuminati Pyramid. Racist Frankenstein is also seen calling him Kevin, which might be his real name.
 The Corporate Ladder (voiced by Todd James) – A green-caped, pipe-smoking ladder with a stool at the top who is impossible to scale/climb (unless you're white and were born into a rich heritage). This mimics the beliefs of some who see corporations as difficult to scale for minorities. He frequently makes fun of White Shadow's leadership and often plots behind White Shadow's back. The Corporate Ladder has had gambling problems in the past and his life's goal was to become a minion. He was also responsible at one point for sending the White Shadow and several members of the organization to prison.
 Racist Frankenstein (voiced by Adam de la Peña) – "Body of a monster, the mind of a racist." Though his name is a direct reference to Frankenstein's monster, Racist Frankenstein is a closer parody of the depiction of Solomon Grundy from the Challenge of the Super Friends animated series, mocking Grundy's heavy southern accent, monstrous appearance and tendency to refer to himself in the third person with poor grammar. Dresses like the stereotype of a WASP, usually in a yuppy-style pink sweater. Racist Frankenstein hates Black people and even black-coloured objects. He is blond and has blue skin. Racist Frankenstein's catchphrase neatly summarizes his master strategy for fighting Minoriteam: "Racist Frankenstein hit Blacks with hands!"
 The Standardized Test (voiced by Peter Girardi) – A giant robot-like man with an eraser on his head and a costume patterned off a Scantron answer sheet. His form refers to the idea that standardized tests are biased against minorities. The Standardized Test speaks with a robotic, monotonous voice.

Secondary White Shadow Organization members featured in some episodes have included:

 Corporate Loophole – An anthropomorphic loop of the rope who is the White Shadow Organization's lawyer. He is familiar with obscure legal 'loopholes' that allow the White Shadow organization to skirt the law.
 Dirty Cop (voiced by Dicky Barrett) – A steaming turd in a police uniform. Dirty Cop is a corrupt and often racist police officer.
 The Plant – A talking potted houseplant representing planted evidence who is usually seen working with Dirty Cop.
 Shamus McFisticuffs – A drunken leprechaun representing the stereotype of the violent and alcoholic Irish-American.
 Steven Skullbird – An eagle-sized bird with a skull head. Its name is a parody of Steven Spielberg (its evil intent is not specified).
 Middle-manager Tom Severson (voiced by Dana Snyder) – A nebbish, bespectacled, one-armed man portraying a stereotypical bureaucrat.
 Stuck Up Girlfriend (voiced by Hope Moore) – A pretty, white, blond, ignorant, spoiled & arrogant young girl (reminiscent of Paris Hilton).

Episodes

Pilot (2005)

Season 1 (2006)

International broadcast
In Canada, Minoriteam previously aired on Teletoon's Teletoon at Night block and also aired on the Canadian version of Adult Swim.

Home media
On August 18, 2012 the entire series was released on DVD by Madman Entertainment in Region 4.

References

External links
 
 

2000s American adult animated television series
2000s American animated comedy television series
2000s American black comedy television series
2000s American parody television series
2000s American superhero comedy television series
2006 American television series debuts
2006 American television series endings
American adult animated comedy television series
American adult animated superhero television series
English-language television shows
Adult Swim original programming
American flash adult animated television series
Superhero teams
Television series by Williams Street
Race-related controversies in animation
Race-related controversies in television
Television controversies in the United States